The following lists events that happened during 2000 in Iran.

Incumbents
 Supreme Leader: Ali Khamenei
 President: Mohammad Khatami 
 Vice President: Hassan Habibi
 Chief Justice: Mahmoud Hashemi Shahroudi

Events

Iranian legislative election, 2000.

Deaths

 June 6 – Houshang Golshiri, 62, Iranian fiction writer.
 October 24 – Fereydoon Moshiri, 73, Iranian poet.

Notable births

See also
 Years in Iran

References

 
Iran
Years of the 20th century in Iran
Iran
2000s in Iran